The Luckiest Man is a Hong Kong anarchic comedy drama produced in 2008 and directed by Lam Tze-chung.

Plot and summary 
The king of gambling 'Mr. Ho' got rich through and became the of the Hong Kong Mahjong industry during the 50s. Mr. Ho has three wives and three children's, his wives appeared to be competing against each other due to the family's wealth as they live in harmony, but at all cost, the three wives have experience in martial arts (Kung Fu), during the dinner they sometimes have a martial arts showdown. The cause of their quarrel was when Mr. Ho brings (Ah Fai) his loved child back home, his wives and the other children want 'Ah Fai' dead. After realizing that he is getting old, he challenges each of his sons to manage a Mahjong parlor which was done for some period of time.

Aside from talking behind his back which his three wives always do, they also poison his food leading to a little scatological humor and the awful mental image of 'Mr Ho' seen spending six hours in the toilet.

He later escapes his crappy life by running around searching for his first love, instead of seeing another freeloader; his long lost grandchild 'Fai' (Bosco Wong) which will be seen as potentially less inheritance money to his order families.

A huge amount was paid just to get cheating masters with more experience to take 'Ah Fai' down in the 'Mahjong' but 'Mr. Ho' notice the setup and decided to hire three good masters in 'Mah Jong' of the 50s who are retired for long, to help 'Ah Fai' and his natural talent makes him masters the techniques of MahJong and that how the challenge begins.

All these was done because he Mr Ho needs to see if one can get the best rest and to be the next (heir) his successor for the Mahjong parlour.

For the family to get rid of 'Ah Fai', the long lost grandchild; they try to pay him off and attempt to drive him from the house using some tricks, like epoxy, aphrodisiac, and itching powder but in the end, it became silly at objectives.

Cast crew 

 Nat Chan Pak-Cheung as Mr 'Ho' Bee Fat
 Yuen Qiu as Sophie (Fat's) 1st wife
 Pinky Cheung Man-Chi as Ling (Fat's) 2nd wife
 Monica Chan Fat-Yung as Yung (Fat's) 3rd wife
 Lam Tze-Chung as Fatty
 Bosco Wong Chung-Chak as Ho Fai
 Timmy Hung Tin-Ming	 as Ho Key
 Danny Chan Kwok-Kwan as Ho Kin
 Deng Zi-Yi as Ciccy Ho
  as Uncle Tin
 Lee Fung (1) as Mimi
 Samuel Pang King-Chi	 as Daredevil 1
 Kit Cheung Man-Kit as Daredevil 2
 Liu Yan-Yu as Daredevil 3
 Leung Wai-Yan
 Tenky Tin Kai-Man as Uncle Tin
 Cheung Tat-Ming as Uncle Ming
 Vincent Kok Tak-Chiu as Uncle Vincent
 Lee Hoi-Sang as Fat's buddy
 Chan Min-Leung	as Fat's buddy
 Mok Wai-Man	 as Fat's buddy
 Yeung Lun (2)	 as Crazy Hon
 Joe Cheng Cho as Doctor Chan
 Terence Tsui Chi-Hung as Steven
 Ng Shui-Ting as Lawyer Lau
 Choi Siu-Jan
 Wu Yuk-Ho
 Hui Sze-Man as Uncle Ming's wife

References

External links 

 
 Hong Kong Movie Database

Sources 

 
 

Hong Kong martial arts comedy films
2000s Mandarin-language films
2008 martial arts films
2008 comedy films
2008 films